John Crombie Cochrane (1835–1887) was a prominent architect in the 19th century practicing in Chicago, Illinois. He formed Cochrane and Garnsey with George O. Garnsey. 

He began work in Davenport, Iowa in 1856, moving to St. Louis in 1858 after the Panic of 1857. With the onset of the Civil War, he returned to his boyhood home in New Hampshire.  In 1864, he moved to Chicago and began working as an architect, with his design being selected for the Illinois State Capitol in 1868.

He designed numerous buildings, including:
Iowa State Capitol, Grand Ave. and E. 12th St., Des Moines, Iowa (Cochrane, J.), listed on the National Register of Historic Places (NRHP)
Illinois State Capitol, Capitol Avenue and Second Street, Springfield, IL NRHP-listed
Cook County Hospital, 1835 West Harrison St., Chicago, IL NRHP-listed
All Saints Episcopal Church, 4550 N. Hermitage, Chicago, IL, Chicago Historical Landmark, a rare local example of the "stick style".
Lambrite-Iles-Petersen House, 510 W. 6th St., Davenport, IA, one of the earliest examples of Italianate architecture in the state of Iowa and a contributing property in the Hamburg Historic District.
Livingston County Courthouse, 112 W. Madison, Pontiac, IL (Cochrane, J.C.) NRHP-listed
Marshall County Courthouse, Courthouse Sq., Marshalltown, IA (Cochrane, J.C.) NRHP-listed
Ivory Quinby House, 605 N. 6th St., Monmouth, IL (Cochrane, J.C.) NRHP-listed
One or more buildings in Marshalltown Downtown Historic District, Roughly bounded by 2nd St., State St., 3rd. Ave., and E. Church St., Marshalltown, IA (Cochrane, John C.) NRHP-listed
One or more buildings in St. Katherine's Historic District, 901 Tremont St., Davenport, IA (Cochrane, John C.) NRHP-listed
The former Scott County Courthouse, Davenport, IA, completed by architect John W. Ross after Cochrane's death
Riverside Presbyterian Church, Riverside, Illinois
Private residence at 140 Herrick Road in Riverside, Illinois

References

Architects from Illinois
Architects from Iowa
1835 births
1887 deaths
19th-century American architects